The 1939–40 League of Ireland was the nineteenth season of the League of Ireland. Shamrock Rovers were the two-time defending champions.

St James's Gate won their second title.

Overview
No new teams were elected to the League.

Cork City withdrew on 13 February 1940. However, a new team, Cork United, were immediately elected in their place, being given special permission to complete Cork City's remaining fixtures.

Teams

Table

Results

Top goalscorers 

Ireland
Lea
League of Ireland seasons